Seri Manjung is a town and the district capital of the Manjung District in Perak, Malaysia. The town was developed by State Government of Perak under Perbadanan Kemajuan Negeri Perak in the 1980s. It is located 7 km from Lumut and 70 km from the state capital, Ipoh. In the adjacent area, north of Seri Manjung is Sitiawan.

Facilities
Manjung District and Land Office
Manjung District Mosque
Hospital Seri Manjung
 ÆON Seri Manjung
 UNIKL MIMET
 Lotus's
 TF Value Mart

Schools
SK Seri Manjung
SK Kampung Dato' Seri Kamaruddin
SJK (T) Mukim Pundut
SK Seri Bayu (Wawasan)
SK Seri Sitiawan
SK Muhammad Saman, Pasir Panjang Laut
SMK Seri Manjung
SMK Seri Samudera
SMK Kampung Dato' Seri Kamaruddin
City Harbour International School

Tertiary education
Institut Kemahiran Mara (IKM) Lumut
Kolej Komuniti Seri Manjung
Kolej Vokasional Seri Manjung

Manjung District
Towns in Perak